Gagea mauritanica  is a Mediterranean plant species  in the lily family. It is native to France (Provence), Italy (Apulia + Sicily), the Balearic Islands, and Algeria.

Gagea mauritanica  is a bulb-forming perennial herb with yellow flowers.

References

mauritanica
Plants described in 1850